Torsby Airport is an airport in Torsby, Sweden .

Airlines and destinations

Statistics

See also
List of the largest airports in the Nordic countries

References

External links

Airports in Sweden